The San Carlos River is a  long tributary of the Gila River in southeast Arizona, United States.

Flowing west, it enters a deep canyon along the Gila–Graham County line. After receiving the Blue River from the right, the river is impounded in a small reservoir, Takalai Lake. Below the lake the valley widens and the river turns south, passing San Carlos and Peridot, before emptying into the northern arm of San Carlos Lake, a reservoir on the Gila River.

Most of the flow in the river originates from springs in the canyons above Takalai Lake. The springs are considered sacred by the San Carlos Apache. Although the upper reaches of the river are perennial, the lower river is frequently dry during the early summer as a result of irrigation diversions.

See also
 List of rivers of Arizona
 List of tributaries of the Colorado River

References

Rivers of Arizona
Tributaries of the Gila River